RSI LA 1 (la uno, formerly TSI 1) is one of two television channels produced by Radiotelevisione Svizzera di lingua Italiana for the Italian-speaking community of Switzerland. LA 1, which can be received in all parts of the country, is a generalist channel with a schedule encompassing news, entertainment, drama, cinema films, documentaries, and sport.

As well as being transmitted digitally throughout the Confederation, LA 1's programmes are also receivable on cable and encoded, via satellite. Until February 28, 2009, the station was called TSI 1, and before that (before TSI 2 went on air) RTSI. RSI LA1 has also been broadcast in HD since February 29, 2012.

Logos and identities

Programmes

News and information
Telegiornale nazionale: main bulletins at 12.30, 20.00 and 23.00, news summaries at 16.00 and 18.00.
Il Regionale: regional news programme.
La Meteo: weather report
Falò 
Il Quotidiano 
L'Agenda

Magazines
Interbang!? 
Mi ritorna in mente 
Origami 
Scacciapensieri 
Storie
EtaBeta  
TV Spot 
Un'ora per voi

Game shows
Attenti a quei due... 
Cash 
Celomanca 
Pausa Pranzo 
Spaccatredici 
UnoNessunoCentomila 
Zerovero

Entertainment
Eurovision Choir
Eurovision Song Contest
Eurovision Young Musicians
Junior Eurovision Song Contest

See also
 Televisione svizzera di lingua italiana
 List of Italian-language television channels

Notes and references

External links
Official website

Television stations in Switzerland
Television channels and stations established in 1958
Italian-language television stations in Switzerland